Emiliano is a male given name. Notable people with the name include:

A–C
 Emiliano Abeyta (1911–1981), Pueblo-American painter
 Emiliano Agüero (born 1995), Argentine footballer
 Emiliano Aguirre (1925–2021), Spanish paleontologist
 Emiliano Albín (born 1989), Uruguayan footballer
 Emiliano Alfaro (born 1988), Uruguayan footballer
 Emiliano Álvarez (1912—1987), Spanish cyclist
 Emiliano Amor (born 1995), Argentine footballer
 Emiliano Ancheta (born 1999), Uruguayan footballer
 Emiliano Armenteros (born 1986), Argentine footballer
 Emiliano Astorga (born 1960), Chilean football manager and former player
 Emiliano Barrera (born 1981), Argentine football manager and former player
 Emiliano Bergamaschi (born 1976), Argentine rugby union coach and former player
 Emiliano Bigica (born 1973), Italian footballer
 Emiliano Boffelli (born 1995), Argentine rugby union player
 Emiliano Bogado (born 1997), Argentine footballer
 Emiliano Bolongaita, Australian academic
 Emiliano Bombini (1543–1592), Italian Roman Catholic prelate, Bishop of Umbriatico
 Emiliano Bonazzoli (born 1979), Italian footballer
 Emiliano Bonfigli (born 1989), Argentine footballer
 Emiliano Brembilla (born 1978), Italian swimmer
 Emiliano Brienza (born 2002), Mexican footballer
 Emiliano Buale (born 1969), Equatoguinean middle-distance runner
 Emiliano Bucci (born 1974), Italian pianist, teacher, musicologist, composer, and sound engineer
 Emiliano Buendía (born 1996), Argentine footballer
 Emiliano Caffera (born 1978), Uruguayan rugby union coach and former player
 Emiliano Caffini (born 1989), Italian rugby union player
 Emiliano Camargo (1917–2007), Colombian épée and foil fencer
 Emiliano Ceccatelli (born 1978), Italian lightweight rower
 Emiliano Çela (born 1985), Albanian football coach and former player
 Emiliano Chamorro Vargas (1871–1966), Nicaraguan military figure and politician, President of Nicaragua 1917–1921 and 1926
 Emiliano Coitiño (born 1998), Uruguayan footballer
 Emiliano Contreras (born 1994), Argentinian cyclist
 Emiliano Cotelo (born 1958), Uruguayan journalist and radio personality

D–L
 Emiliano Dei (born 1971), Italian footballer
 Emiliano Di Cavalcanti (1897–1976), Brazilian painter
 Emiliano Díaz (born 1982), Italian footballer
 Emiliano Díez (born 1953), Cuban-American actor
 Emiliano Dudar (born 1981), Argentine footballer
 Emiliano Dumestre (born 1987), Uruguayan rower
 Emiliano Ellacopulos (born 1992), Greek-Argentine footballer
 Emiliano Endrizzi (born 1994), Argentine footballer
 Emiliano Fenu (born 1977), Italian politician
 Emiliano R. Fernández (1894–1949), Paraguayan poet, musician, and soldier
 Emiliano Figueroa (1866–1931), President of Chile 1925–1927
 Emiliano Franco (born 1994), Spanish-Argentine footballer
 Emiliano Fruto (born 1984), Colombian Major League Baseball pitcher
 Emiliano Fusco (born 1986), Argentine footballer
 Emiliano García (born 2003), Mexican footballer
 Emiliano García-Page (born 1968), Spanish politician
 Emiliano Garré (born 1981), Argentine footballer
 Emiliano Ghan (born 1995), Uruguayan footballer
 Emiliano Rudolf Giambelli (born 1989), stage name Emis Killa, Italian rapper
 Emiliano Giron (born 1972), Dominican baseball pitcher
 Emiliano Gómez (disambiguation), multiple people
 Emiliano González (disambiguation), multiple people
 Emiliano Grillo (born 1992), Argentine golfer
 Emiliano Ibarra (born 1982), Argentine cyclist
 Emiliano Insúa (born 1989), Argentine footballer
 Emiliano Landolina (born 1986), Italian footballer
 Emiliano Lasa (born 1990), Uruguayan long jumper
 Emiliano Lauzi (born 1994), Italian snowboarder

M–R
 Emiliano Madriz (c. 1800–1845), Nicaraguan lawyer and politician
 Emiliano Marcondes (born 1995), Danish footballer
 Emiliano Marsili (born 1976), Italian boxer
 Emiliano Martínez (born 1992), Argentine football goalkeeper
 Emiliano Martínez (footballer, born 1999), Uruguayan football midfielder
 Emiliano Mascetti (1943–2022), Italian footballer and football executive
 Emiliano Massa (born 1988), Argentine tennis player
 Emiliano Massimo (born 1989), Italian footballer
 Emiliano Mayola (born 1987), Argentine footballer
 Emiliano Melis (born 1979), Italian footballer
 Emiliano Méndez (born 1989), Argentine footballer
 Emiliano Mercado del Toro (1891–2007), Puerto Rican military veteran who was the world's oldest person
 Emiliano Esono Michá, Equatoguinean political activist
 Emiliano Mondonico (1947–2018), Italian footballer and coach
 Emiliano Monge (born 1978), Mexican short story writer and novelist
 Emiliano Morbidelli (born 1977) Italian Vatican City long-distance runner
 Emiliano Moretti (born 1981), Italian footballer
 Emiliano Morlans (born 1952), Spanish cross-country skier
 Emiliano Mozzone (born 1998), Uruguayan footballer
 Emiliano Mundrucu (1791–1863), Brazilian soldier, abolitionist, and civil rights activist
 Emiliano Mutti (born 1933), Italian geologist
 Emiliano Ortega (born 1937), Chilean politician
 Emiliano Ozuna (born 1996), Argentine footballer
 Emiliano Papa (born 1982), Argentine footballer
 Emiliano Pattarello (born 1999), Italian footballer
 Emiliano Pedreira (born 1985), Argentine footballer
 Emiliano Pedrozo (born 1972), Argentine-born Salvadoran football manager and former player
 Emiliano Piedra (1931–1991), Spanish film producer
 Emiliano Pizzoli (born 1974), Italian hurdler
 Emiliano Purita (born 1997), Argentine footballer
 Emiliano Qirngnuq, Canadian politician
 Emiliano Ramos (born 1979), Mexican left-wing politician
 Emiliano Reali (born 1976), Italian writer and blogger
 Emiliano Redondo (1937–2014), Spanish actor
 Emiliano Revilla (born 1928), Spanish industrialist and kidnapping victim
 Emiliano Rey (born 1975), Argentine footballer
 Emiliano Reyes (born 1984), American business executive and humanitarian activist
 Emiliano Rigoni (born 1993), Argentine footballer
 Emiliano Rodríguez (born 1937), Spanish basketball player
 Emiliano Romay (born 1977), Argentine footballer
 Emiliano Romero (disambiguation), multiple people
 Emiliano Rodolfo Rosales-Birou (born 1990), alias Chuggaaconroy, American YouTuber and Let's Player

S–Z
 Emiliano Saguier (fl. 1960s), Paraguayan chess player
 Emiliano Sala (1990–2019), Argentine footballer
 Emiliano Salinas (born 1976), Mexican venture capitalist and businessman
 Emiliano Salvetti (born 1974), Italian footballer
 Emiliano Sanchez (born 1977), Argentine speedway rider
 Emiliano Sciarra (born 1971), Italian board-, card-, and video-game designer
 Emiliano Spataro (born 1976), Argentine racing driver
 Emiliano Storani (born 1993), Italian footballer
 Emiliano Strappini (born 1986), Argentinian footballer
 Emiliano Tabone (born 1991), Argentine footballer
 Emiliano Tade (born 1988), Argentine footballer
 Emiliano Tarana (born 1979), Italian footballer
 Emiliano Tardif (1928–1999), Canadian Roman Catholic priest and missionary
 Emiliano Té (born 1983), Bissau-Guinean footballer
 Emiliano Tellechea (born 1987), Uruguayan footballer
 Emiliano Terzaghi (born 1993), Argentine footballer
 Emiliano Testini (born 1977), Italian footballer
 Emiliano Torres (born 1971), Argentine film director, screenwriter, and producer
 Emiliano Tortolano (born 1990), Italian footballer
 Emiliano Vecchio (born 1988), Argentine footballer
 Emiliano Velázquez (born 1994), Uruguayan footballer
 Emiliano Velázquez Esquivel (born 1964), Mexican politician
 Emiliano Veliaj (born 1985), Albanian footballer
 Emiliano Villar (born 1999), Uruguayan footballer
 Emiliano Viviano (born 1985), Italian footballer 
 Emiliano Yacobitti (born 1975), Argentine politician
 Emiliano Zapata (1879–1919), Mexican revolutionary
 Emiliano Elias Zapata (born 1986), Argentine footballer
 Emiliano Zuleta (1912–2005), Colombian vallenato composer, accordion player, and singer
 Emiliano Zurita, Mexican actor, writer and producer

See also
 Emiliano Zapata (disambiguation)
 Emilia (given name)
 Emilian (disambiguation)
 Emiliana (disambiguation)

Italian masculine given names
Spanish masculine given names